"Two Aces" is the sixth episode of the American sports comedy-drama television series Ted Lasso, based on the character played by Jason Sudeikis in a series of promos for NBC Sports' coverage of England's Premier League. The episode was written by executive producer Bill Wrubel and directed by Elliot Hegarty. It was released on Apple TV+ on September 4, 2020.

The series follows Ted Lasso, an American college football coach, who is unexpectedly recruited to coach a fictional English Premier League soccer team, AFC Richmond, despite having no experience coaching soccer. The team's owner, Rebecca Welton, hires Lasso hoping he will fail as a means of exacting revenge on the team's previous owner, Rupert, her unfaithful ex-husband. In the episode, Ted tries to get Jamie to cooperate more with the club, while the club becomes convinced that there is a curse on the treatment room.

The episode received positive reviews from critics, who praised the humor, performances, tone and character development. For his performance in the episode, Brendan Hunt was nominated for Outstanding Supporting Actor in a Comedy Series at the 73rd Primetime Emmy Awards.

Plot
Ted (Jason Sudeikis) returns to coaching, despite feeling distracted for the end of his marriage. During a press conference, he states that Jamie (Phil Dunster) will only compete if he adheres to his strategies. Rebecca (Hannah Waddingham) informs him that Jamie is going to return to Manchester City F.C. by the end of the season, as he is part of a loan to Richmond. The club wants Jamie back if he will remain benched, and Jamie is also refusing to train with Richmond.

AFC Richmond welcomes Dani Rojas (Cristo Fernández), a Mexican forward, to replace Jamie's place. Dani's enthusiasm and field skills impress the team, causing Jamie to feel jealous. During training, Dani gets injured and blames the treatment room, which the whole club believes to be haunted by ghosts. The history involved 400 soccer players in 1914 joining for tryouts, but actually they were drafted into World War I. To ease fears, Ted has the team sacrifice a special item to lift the curse in the treatment room. Jamie is not interested in assisting, but is convinced after talking with Keeley (Juno Temple).

Rebecca discovers that Rupert now has a new girlfriend, also named Rebecca. Due to this, the media has now labeled Rebecca as "Old Rebecca", which annoys her. Sam (Toheeb Jimoh) invites her to sacrifice something in the treatment room. At the ceremony, Roy brings a blanket, Sam brings a photo of the Nigeria national football team that played at the 1994 FIFA World Cup, Nate brings sunglasses, Rebecca brings that day's newspaper, and Higgins (Jeremy Swift) brings his cat's collar, all of the items are burned. Jamie also appears, burning the shoes that his mother gave him to motivate him to play soccer. The next morning, the club is now more ecstatic, their spirits lifted. However, Ted finds that Jamie returned to Manchester City, making him furious with Rebecca for allowing the transfer. Cheered up by Dani's claim that "football is life", Ted retires Jamie's jersey from the locker room.

Development

Production
The character of Ted Lasso first appeared in 2013 as part of NBC Sports promoting their coverage of the Premier League, portrayed by Jason Sudeikis. In October 2019, Apple TV+ gave a series order to a series focused on the character, with Sudeikis reprising his role and co-writing the episode with executive producer Bill Lawrence. Sudeikis and collaborators Brendan Hunt and Joe Kelly started working on a project around 2015, which evolved further when Lawrence joined the series. The episode was directed by Elliot Hegarty and written by executive producer Bill Wrubel. This was Hegarty's second directing credit, and Wrubel's first writing credit for the show.

Casting
The series announcement confirmed that Jason Sudeikis would reprise his role as the main character. Other actors who are credited as series regulars include Hannah Waddingham, Jeremy Swift, Phil Dunster, Brett Goldstein, Brendan Hunt, Nick Mohammed, and Juno Temple.

Critical reviews
"Two Aces" received positive reviews from critics. Gissane Sophia of Marvelous Geeks Media wrote, "At the end of the day, this team and this showcase is all for tangible growth and change. 'Two Aces' reminds the audience of the fact that softness is a strength, and that teamwork really makes the dream work. On any other show, I'd scream enough with the metaphors, but on Ted Lasso, it works. It always works." 

Mads Lennon of FanSided wrote, "New team member Dani Rojas joins AFC Richmond in the episode. Dani turns out to be an incredible soccer player, which is fantastic for Ted since he's still struggling to get Jamie to cooperate with the team. He refuses to attend practice, triggering a rare blow-up from the usually genial coach. If it sounded familiar to you, it's because the series was cleverly parodying the infamous Allen Iverson rant." Daniel Hart of Ready Steady Cut gave the episode a 3.5 star rating out of 5 wrote, "'Two Aces' sees Ted go to great lengths to help raise team spirit."

Awards and accolades
Brendan Hunt submitted this episode for consideration for his Primetime Emmy Award for Outstanding Supporting Actor in a Comedy Series nomination at the 73rd Primetime Emmy Awards. He lost the award to his co-star, Brett Goldstein.

References

External links
 

Ted Lasso episodes
2020 American television episodes